The Alive! Tour was a concert tour by Kiss, in support of their 1975 live album Alive!. The tour began on September 10, 1975 and concluded on March 28, 1976.

History 
At the time of the European leg of the tour the Destroyer album was already released and the band performed songs from that album, but they wore the Alive! costumes and had the Alive! stage show. At the time, the tour was referred to under the headline "Kiss tour", not "Alive! Tour" or "Destroyer Tour".

At the Cobo Hall show, Paul Stanley began using Pete Townshend's famous ritual of smashing his guitar, employing it after "Let Me Go, Rock 'n' Roll", until it was eventually done after "Rock and Roll All Nite" in later years.

In the tour program for the band's final tour, Stanley reflected on the tour:

Setlists

Songs played overall
"Deuce"
"Strutter"
"Flaming Youth"
"Got to Choose"
"C'mon and Love Me"
"Hotter than Hell"
"Firehouse"
"She" Ace Frehley guitar solo
"Parasite"
"Ladies in Waiting"
"Nothin' to Lose"
"Watchin' You"
"God of Thunder"
"Shout It Out Loud"
Gene Simmons bass solo
"100,000 Years" and Peter Criss drum solo
"Black Diamond"
Encore
"Detroit Rock City"
"Rock Bottom"
"Cold Gin"
"Rock and Roll All Nite"
"Let Me Go, Rock 'n' Roll"

Typical setlist
"Deuce"
"Strutter"
"Flaming Youth"
"Hotter than Hell"
"Firehouse"
"She" and Ace Frehley guitar solo
"Nothin' to Lose"
"Shout It Out Loud"
Gene Simmons bass solo
"100,000 Years" and Peter Criss drum solo
"Black Diamond"
Encore
"Cold Gin"
"Rock & Roll All Nite"
"Let Me Go Rock 'N' Roll"

Songs played overall (1975)
"Deuce"
"Strutter"
"Got to Choose"
"Hotter than Hell"
"Firehouse"
"She" and Ace Frehley guitar solo
"Nothin' to Lose"
"Ladies in Waiting"
"C'mon & Love Me"
"Parasite"
"Watchin' You"
Gene Simmons bass solo
"100,000 Years" and Peter Criss drum solo
"Black Diamond"
Encore
"Rock Bottom"
"Cold Gin"
"Rock and Roll All Nite"
"Let Me Go, Rock 'n' Roll"

Typical setlist (1975)
"Deuce"
"Strutter"
"Got to Choose"
"Hotter Than Hell"
"Firehouse"
"She" and Ace Frehley guitar solo
"Nothin' to Lose"
"C'mon and Love Me"
Gene Simmons bass solo
"100,000 Years" and Peter Criss drum solo
"Black Diamond"
Encore
"Cold Gin"
"Rock and Roll All Nite"
"Let Me Go, Rock 'n' Roll"

Songs played overall (1976)
"Deuce"
"Strutter"
"C'mon and Love Me"
"Hotter than Hell"
"Firehouse"
"She" and Ace Frehley guitar solo
"Parasite"
"Ladies in Waiting"
"Nothin' to Lose"
"Shout It Out Loud"
"Gene Simmons bass solo"
"100,000 Years" and Peter Criss drum solo
"Black Diamond"
Encore
"Cold Gin"
"Rock and Roll All Nite"
"Let Me Go, Rock 'n' Roll"

Typical setlist (1976)
"Deuce"
"Strutter"
"C'mon and Love Me"
"Hotter than Hell"
"Firehouse"
"She" and Ace Frehley guitar solo
"Parasite"
"Nothin' to Lose"
Gene Simmons bass solo
"100,000 Years" and Peter Criss drum solo
"Black Diamond"
Encore
"Cold Gin"
"Rock and Roll All Nite"
"Let Me Go, Rock 'n' Roll"

Information
 Got to Choose: Only performed live in 1975 (Replaced by "C'mon & Love Me" and then by "Flaming Youth")
 C'mon and Love Me: Only performed in North America• Switched places in the set and replaced "Got to Choose" -> Replaced by "Flaming Youth"
 Flaming Youth: Only performed in Canada (Replaced "Got to Choose" and "C'mon & Love Me")
 Parasite: Only performed in North America (Replaced by "Ladies in Waiting" for some shows and then by "God of Thunder")
 Ladies in Waiting: Replaced "Parasite" for some shows -> Replaced by "God of Thunder"
 Watchin' You: Only performed in 1975 for some shows (Replaced by "Shout It Out Loud")
 Shout It Out Loud: Only performed in 1976 (Replaced "Watchin' You")
 Cold Gin: Only performed in North America as the encore opener (Replaced by "Detroit Rock City")
 Rock Bottom: Performed before "Cold Gin" as the encore opener for some shows

Tour dates

Box office score data

Personnel
Paul Stanley – vocals, rhythm guitar
Gene Simmons – vocals, bass
Peter Criss – drums, vocals
Ace Frehley – lead guitar, backing vocals

References

Bibliography

Kiss (band) concert tours
1975 concert tours
1976 concert tours